Jenny Drivala (Kalamata, Greece 1957) is a Greek soprano singer.

History 
Drivala studied Byzantine literature at the University of Athens, classical ballet ( Morianova School), acting at the National Theatre School, piano (under Aikis Pandzari and G. Arvanitaki) and singing (under Eirini Lambrinidou and Mireille Flery) at the Athens Conservatory. She completed her musical studies at the University of Bremen under John Modinos (1980).

She debuted in the title role of Donizetti's Lucia di Lammermoor at the Greek National Opera and at the Teatro Petruzzelli in Bari, Italy in 1983.
From 1982 to 2007 she interpreted leading roles in approximately twenty operas: La traviata, Rigoletto, and L'Assedio di Corinto as Greek National Opera premieres, Attila, Anna Bolena, Die Entführung aus dem Serail, and Die sieben Todsünden as Greek National Opera premieres, Die Zauberflöte, La bohème, Pagliacci, Les contes d'Hoffmann, Die Fledermaus, Faust (Athens Festival 1994), among others. 

Since 2008 she works as a director. She has sung in the world premieres of The Return of Helen by Thanos Mikroutsikos (1993) and Antigone by Mikis Theodorakis (1999) at the Athens Concert Hall.

Awards
 Gold Medal at the International Singing Competition of Toulouse (1977)
 Best Interpreter Award Spoleto, Italy
 1st prize at the Vincenzo Bellini International Competition, Italy (1983)
 UNESCO Maria Callas Prize (2016)
 Traetta Prize (2018)

Recordings
 Songs I Love – London 1995 Sommrecords
 The Crucifixion – Byzantine Opera by Y. Boufides Athens 1996 
 Christmas 2000 – Athens 2000
 Antigone – Opera by M.Theodorakis
 Brentano Lieder – Daphne - by R. Strauss
 Aria – Athens (2006) – Arias by Bellini, Verdi, Meyerbeer, Mozard
 Mozart: Mitridate, Re di Ponto (as Aspasia) – Teatro la Fenice (1999), Concuctor: Roderick Brydon"

Cinema
Malina by Werner Schroeter (1991)
 by Werner Schroeter (1996)

References

1957 births
Living people
Greek operatic sopranos
People from Kalamata
21st-century Greek women opera singers
20th-century Greek women opera singers
National and Kapodistrian University of Athens alumni
University of Bremen alumni